Goa Dental College is located in Bambolim near Panjim, Goa, India, opposite Goa Medical College. It has a hospital facility as well and is affiliated to Goa University.

Courses offered include BDS and MDS; 50 students are enrolled in the BDS program each year.

Departments
Goa Dental College and Hospital has 9 Departments:

 Department of Oral Medicine and Radiology
 Department of Pedodontics and Preventive Dentistry
 Department of Orthodontics and Dentofacial Orthopedics
 Department of Periodontics
 Department of Oral and Maxillofacial Surgery
 Department of Conservative Dentistry and Endodontics
 Department of Prosthodontics
 Department of Public Health Dentistry
 Department of Oral and Maxillofacial Pathology

References

External links

Universities and colleges in Goa
Dental colleges in India
Education in North Goa district
Health in Goa
Educational institutions in India with year of establishment missing